Baron Marie-Charles-Théodore de Damoiseau de Montfort (6 April 1768 in Besançon – 6 August 1846) was a French astronomer.

Damoiseau was originally an artillery officer but he left France in 1792 during the French Revolution.  He worked as assistant director of the Lisbon Observatory before he returned to France in 1807.

In 1825, he was elected a member of the French Academy of Sciences. He was a member of the Bureau des Longitudes.

He is best known for publishing lunar tables (positions of the Moon) between 1824–1828.

Scientific work

Theory of the Moon

In 1818 Laplace proposed that the Académie des Sciences in Paris set up a prize to be awarded to whoever succeeded in constructing lunar tables based solely on the law of universal gravity. In 1820 the prize was awarded to Carlini and Plana and to Damoiseau by a committee of which Laplace was a member.

Satellites of Jupiter

See also

David P. Todd, A continuation of de Damoiseau's tables of the satellites of Jupiter, to the year 1900, 1876
John Couch Adams, Continuation of Tables I. and III. of Damoiseau's Tables of Jupiter's satellites, 1877

Honors
 He won the Gold Medal of the Royal Astronomical Society in 1831.
 Elected a Foreign Honorary Member of the American Academy of Arts and Sciences in 1832.*
 The crater Damoiseau on the Moon is named after him.

Manuscripts

The Paris observatory holds a large set of manuscripts from Damoiseau. See Manuscrits Damoiseau on http://alidade.obspm.fr

Publications

Éphémérides nauticas, ou Diario astronomico para 1799 [-1805] calculado no Observatorio real da marinha (8 volumes, 1798–1802)
Memoria relativa aos eclipses do sol visiveis em Lisboa, desde 1800 até 1900 inclusivamente (1801)
Tables de la lune, formées par la seule théorie de l'attraction et suivant la division de la circonférence en 400 degrés (1824)
Tables de la lune, formées par la seule théorie de l'attraction et suivant la division de la circonférence en 360 degrés (1828)
Tables écliptiques des satellites de Jupiter, d'après la théorie de leurs attractions mutuelles et les constantes déduites des observations (1836), https://books.google.com/books?id=E-gRAAAAYAAJ

References

G. Tagliaferri and P. Tucci, Carlini and Plana on the theory of the moon and their dispute with Laplace, Ann. of Sci. 56 (3) (1999), 221-269.

External links
 French Academy of Sciences on-line biography

1768 births
1846 deaths
19th-century French astronomers
Recipients of the Gold Medal of the Royal Astronomical Society
Scientists from Besançon
Fellows of the American Academy of Arts and Sciences
Foreign Members of the Royal Society
Members of the French Academy of Sciences
Recipients of the Lalande Prize